|}

The King George VI and Queen Elizabeth Stakes is a Group 1 flat horse race in Great Britain open to horses aged three years or older. It is run at Ascot over a distance of 1 mile 3 furlongs and 211 yards (2,406 metres), and it is scheduled to take place each year in July.

It is Britain's most prestigious open-age flat race, and its roll of honour features some of the most highly acclaimed horses of the sport's recent history. The 1975 running, which involved a hard-fought battle to the finish between Grundy and Bustino, is frequently described as the "race of the century". Many of its winners subsequently compete in the Prix de l'Arc de Triomphe, and a number go on to have a successful career at stud. The race is often informally referred to as the "King George".

History
The event was formed as the result of an amalgamation of two separate races at Ascot which were established in 1946 and 1948. The first of these, named after King George VI, was a 2-mile contest for three-year-olds held in October. The second, in honour of his wife, Queen Elizabeth, was a one and a half-mile event staged in July. The idea was conceived by Major John Crocker Bulteel, the Clerk of the Course at Ascot, who wanted to create an important international race over one and a half miles for horses aged three or older. The inaugural running of the combined race took place on 21 July 1951. In its first year, to commemorate the Festival of Britain, it was titled the King George VI and Queen Elizabeth Festival of Britain Stakes.

During the early part of its history the King George VI and Queen Elizabeth Stakes was not commercially sponsored. Its first period of sponsorship started in 1972, when it began a long association with the diamond company De Beers. The word "Diamond" was added to the race's title when permission for its inclusion was given by Queen Elizabeth II in 1975. It became known as the King George VI and Queen Elizabeth Diamond Stakes, and De Beers continued to back the event until 2006.

The online betting company Betfair started to sponsor the King George in 2009, and its prize fund was increased from £750,000 to £1,000,000. It is now Britain's second richest horse race, with a purse exceeded only by that of The Derby.

The King George VI and Queen Elizabeth Stakes became part of the Breeders' Cup Challenge series in 2011. The winner now earns an automatic invitation to compete in the same year's Breeders' Cup Turf.Most successful horse (3 wins):
Enable – 2017, 2019, 2020

Leading jockey (7 wins):
 Lester Piggott – Meadow Court (1965), Aunt Edith (1966), Park Top (1969), Nijinsky (1970), Dahlia (1974), The Minstrel (1977), Teenoso (1984)
 Frankie Dettori – Lammtarra (1995), Swain (1998), Daylami (1999), Doyen (2004), Enable (2017, 2019, 2020)

Leading trainer (6 wins):
 Sir Michael Stoute – Shergar (1981), Opera House (1993), Golan (2002), Conduit (2009), Harbinger (2010), Poet's Word (2018)

Leading owner (6 wins): (includes part ownership)
 Michael Tabor – Montjeu (2000), Galileo (2001), Hurricane Run (2006), Dylan Thomas (2007), Duke of Marmalade (2008), Highland Reel (2016)

Winners

The time of the 1962 race was incorrectly given on the day of the race as 2 min. 32.02 and corrected to 2 min. 37.02 in October 1962.
 Since 2006 the race has been run over the same distance but over a reconstructed course in the final two furlongs

See also
 Horse racing in Great Britain
 List of British flat horse races
 King George VI and Queen Elizabeth Stakes top three finishers

References

 Paris-Turf:
 Racing Post:

 galopp-sieger.de – King George VI and Queen Elizabeth Stakes.
 horseracingintfed.com – International Federation of Horseracing Authorities – Race Detail (2018).
 pedigreequery.com – King George VI & Queen Elizabeth Stakes – Ascot.
 tbheritage.com – King George VI and Queen Elizabeth Diamond Stakes.
 
 
 Race Recordings 

 
Flat races in Great Britain
Ascot Racecourse
Open middle distance horse races
Breeders' Cup Challenge series
Recurring sporting events established in 1951
British Champions Series
1951 establishments in England